Admiral William Rawdon Napier,  (13 June 1877 – 8 April 1951) was a Royal Navy officer who served as First Naval Member and Chief of the Australian Naval Staff from 1926 to 1929.

Naval service
Napier joined the Royal Navy as a naval cadet in January 1891. He was promoted to lieutenant on 15 January 1898. From 25 July 1902 he was posted to the cruiser HMS St George, serving in the Cruiser squadron, before becoming torpedo officer (T) in the cruiser HMS Good Hope when it commissioned for service in the Atlantic Fleet in November 1902.

He served during the First World War and was mentioned in despatches for his service in the Gallipoli campaign and awarded the Distinguished Service Order for minesweeping operations. He was appointed First Naval Member and Chief of the Australian Naval Staff in 1926; promoted vice-admiral on 31 July 1929 and retired the following day.

He was promoted to full admiral in 1933. He died at his home in Fareham in Hampshire in 1951.

References

1877 births
1951 deaths
Companions of the Distinguished Service Order
Companions of the Order of St Michael and St George
Companions of the Order of the Bath
Royal Navy admirals
Royal Navy personnel of World War I
Military personnel from Hampshire